Avignon is a regional county municipality located in the Gaspésie–Îles-de-la-Madeleine region of Quebec, Canada. Its seat and largest city is Carleton-sur-Mer.

It is on the Gaspé Peninsula, along Chaleur Bay.

Subdivisions
There are 13 subdivisions and 2 native reserves within the RCM:

Cities & Towns (1)
 Carleton-sur-Mer

Municipalities (9)
 Escuminac
 L'Ascension-de-Patapédia
 Maria
 Matapédia
 Nouvelle
 Pointe-à-la-Croix
 Saint-Alexis-de-Matapédia
 Saint-André-de-Restigouche
 Saint-François-d'Assise

Townships (1)
 Ristigouche-Partie-Sud-Est

Unorganized Territory (2)
 Rivière-Nouvelle
 Ruisseau-Ferguson

Native Reserves (2)
 Gesgapegiag 2
 Listuguj

Demographics

Population

Language

Transportation

Access Routes

Highways and numbered routes that run through the municipality, including external routes that start or finish at the county border:

Autoroutes
None

Principal Highways

Secondary Highways
None

External Routes
None

Attractions
Battle of Restigouche National Historic Site (Pointe-à-la-Croix)
Fort Listiguj (Pointe-à-la-Croix)
Notre-Dame-du-Mont-St-Joseph Oratory (Carleton---Saint Omer)

Protected Areas

Casualt ZEC
Rivières-Matapédia et Patapédia Wildlife Reserve
Miguasha Provincial Park
Saint-Omer National Migratory Bird Sanctuary

See also
 List of regional county municipalities and equivalent territories in Quebec

References

External links 
Municipalities and cities of Gaspé region

 
Census divisions of Quebec